Willingale may refer to:

 Willingale, Essex
 Willingale Airfield, RAF Station Chipping Ongar, a former World War II airfield in Essex, England

People
 Thomas Willingale
 Betty Willingale